Sasural Genda Phool is an Indian television drama series that aired on StarPlus starring Ragini Khanna and Jay Soni. It aired during weekday evenings from 1 March 2010 to 21 April 2012. Its plot was written at the same time as Star Jalsha series Ogo Bodhu Sundori, and many people misinterpreted the series to be a remake while both were original series. It is based on the backdrop of Old Delhi.

Plot

Suhana Bajpai is a gorgeous, energetic young woman who lost her mother Vidisha when she was a child. Kamal Kishore Bajpai, Suhana's father, is unable to provide Suhana with sufficient time despite his best efforts. Suhana has a legendary temper and a materialistic mentality as a result of being deprived of his attention and Vidisha's love. In an act of spontaneous anger, she accepts to marry anyone Kamal chooses for her.

Ishaan Kashyap is an IT professional who grew up in a joint household and is polite, shy, and good-natured. However, he lacks a partner due to his introverted and awkward personality around women. He gives up and resolves to marry whomever his family determines to be a good match for him.

Kamal Kishore Bajpai and Ishaan coincidentally meet. After observing the Kashyap family's love and kindness, Kamal realises that this is the home that Suhana requires in her life. He requests Ishaan for Suhana's hand in marriage, which the Kashyaps accept. Suhana and Ishaan get married.

However, the marriage gets off to a bad start. Suhana makes it clear to Ishaan that she does not love him, as she is still suffering from a recent breakup. He decides to allow her time to heal her wounds. Suhana eventually begins to bond with the family, particularly with Shailaja, Ishaan's aunt (called Badi Ma by everyone), whom Suhana admires as the motherly figure she has been lacking in her life. Suhana gradually begins to care for Ishaan as a result of living together. She also learns more about the family with time.

The Kashyaps have several hidden pains and dark pasts. Ishwar Kashyap, Badi Ma's ambitious husband and the eldest child of Dadaji and Dadiji, had deserted her, and her children - Inder and Panna - for a supposedly bright future in the USA, whereby he remarried a woman named Meera, much to the whole family’s shock. Post this, Dadaji snaps connections with Ishwar and doesn’t consider him as a son of the family. And in order to make up for Ishwar’s absence, his younger brother Alok whole-heartedly sacrificed all his dreams and ambitions to look after his family and cater to their needs. Another dark secret is that Radha, the foster daughter to the head of the family Ambarnath Kashyap (Dadaji), is still suffering from the pain of being a rape victim on her wedding night. She is unable to heal from her pain as the child born out of that incident, Deepak, has an uncanny resemblance to the man who raped her. Ilesh, Ishaan and Inder's cousin is perpetually unemployed and not interested in working. His wife Disha is struggling to conceive. These are the sorrows that make Suhana realize that life is about accepting them and moving on with a smile.

Still, Suhana doesn't find herself consciously in love with Ishaan, She tries to leave the house but decides to stay and take care of Badi Ma after she falls ill from the shock. Each time she mentions leaving the house, she doesn't realise that she is hurting Ishaan very terribly.

Ishaan's childhood friend, Sonali, is invited over to make Suhana jealous. Suhana realizes that she does love Ishaan and eventually confesses her love for Ishaan in front of everyone, and Sonali goes home. Ishaan and Suhana go to Goa for their honeymoon where they bare their souls to one another and come closer. Meanwhile, depressed after losing his job, Panna's husband Raunak leaves her and his family. He does this so that he can become stable and get a high-paying job again. At this time, Deepak also comes to stay with his family, having settled things with his mother. As time passes in Raunak's absence, the fractured relationship between Panna and her mother-in-law is repaired, leading to the repair in the relationship between the Kashyaps and the Sharmas. Ilesh gets a job with a construction company and earns a lot of money, which raises suspicion in the minds of Ishaan and Inder.

Suhana unexpectedly faints at Holi, leading to the family think that she is pregnant. But they later find out that she is not pregnant but is shockingly suffering from a brain tumor. However, they are overjoyed to later learn that the tumor is completely benign. Suhana undergoes her surgery and is completely healed. Mysterious love letters to an I. Kashyap arrive to Suhana and Rajni. They doubt Ishaan and Inder. They find that their neighbour, Jassi, was having an affair with a girl and was using I. Kashyap as his name, and when their mailbox broke, his game was ruined. When the problem is solved, Suhana apologizes to Ishaan for doubting him.

Ishaan meets with an accident. He loses the memory of the past two years of his life, thus forgetting Suhana and his marriage to her. Suhana stays in the Kashyap house as Shashikala, Disha's friend. After being around "Shashikala", Ishaan feels connected to her but cannot pursue her because she is married. During this time, Ishwar returns to India and bumps into his father and Shailaja, who fail to acknowledge him. While the elders of the family get the news of Ishwar's return, Dadiji begs Dadaji to forgive Ishwar, much to the family's shock, thereby compelling Dadaji to take stern action on anyone who tries contacting Ishwar. 
After a few hilarious turns, Ishaan decides to marry Shashikala, come what may. At the wedding altar, he reveals that he has regained his memory, thanks to tripping over a bench that Suhana had overturned in a fit of anger.

Disha is depressed as she learns of her inability to conceive a child, which comes as a shocker for the family wondering why the matter was hidden from them. Suhana finds a baby in the park and brings it home, suggesting Disha, to adopt her. Everyone is surprised and touched by this gesture. As the baby named Khushi by the family makes an impact on them, it starts affecting Suhana and Ishaan's married life as Suhana ignores Ishaan to attend to Khushi. But troubles attack the Kashyap family threefold - Ilesh is found guilty of bribery and money laundering. His company refuses to recognize him as an employee. Also, Khushi's birth parents turn up and the family tearfully hands over the baby to her parents. What makes it worse is that the family gets a shocker to know that Ishwar is back in Delhi, from Inder and Panna, after paying him a visit, and Shailaja meeting Ishwar secretly, on Dadiji's insistence, much to Dadaji and Alok's displeasure.

Ishaan expresses his happiness over his promotion and his transfer to Mumbai. Ishaan is happy because this is his chance for him to prove himself, as he has been battling for his identity within the family. He is fed up of being treated as a child and kept away from the serious decisions of the family. Ishaan and Suhana move to Mumbai and get to know the Mumbai life. Meanwhile, Ilesh is acquitted and found not guilty.

In Mumbai, Ishaan meets up with Sonali. Ishaan and Suhana find out that Sonali has married to Abhishek, who is obsessive about her. Ishaan finds out that Sonali is suffering an abuse because of this. Meanwhile, Ishwar has returned to the Kashyap's, Although no one wants to accept him, he is trying to be forceful with them to accept and forgive him. Panna is pregnant, but Ishwar ruins the joy. Suhana accidentally finds out about Ishwar's return and feels the desperate need to connect to Badi Maa. She rushes to Delhi and finds out that Ishwar has conspired against the family to gain ownership of the house, because he wants to sell it, under the pretext of selling some of the family's jewelry. She exposes this to the entire family and they are shocked to the core. Finally, as Kashyap family gets closure about this, Dadaji and the others throw Ishwar out of the house and severs ties with him. While Ishaan is furious that everyone knew about Ishwar's return and his conspiracy, but did not let him in on the matter, Dadiji blames herself for Ishwar's deception, and for letting Shailaja meet him.

Suhana sees Sonali with Ishaan and doubts him of having an affair with her. She leaves him and returns to Delhi. She then brings Badi Maa and Alok to Mumbai who help her find out the truth that Abhishek was hitting Sona and apologises her and is back with Ishaan. Upon return to Delhi, Suhana declares to the family that she wishes to start working. She receives an offer to star in a television show as the lead. Rano, her mother-in-law, is against it, but everyone else supports her. Ilesh accompanies Suhana to the shoot and later enjoys handling and managing her career as her agent. This leads to a disturbance in the family as Rano feels that Suhana is ignoring her wifely duties towards Ishaan; Disha feels that Ilesh is not getting his due respect from Suhana as her older brother-in-law because of being employed by her. Ishaan also gets egoistic over the fact that Suhana earns more than him and is a star. However, his father shatters those illusions for him and he realizes his mistake.

In midst of all this, Sanjana (Suhana's sister) and Deepak fall in love with each other. Deepak tells the truth to Sanjana that he is a rape child and Sanjana accepts it. But she is reluctant to tell the truth to her father. Radha's husband, who sold her to the man who insulted her, mocks the engagement ceremony by revealing the truth to everyone. Kamal rejects the alliance between Deepak and Sanjana as Deepak is illegitimate. The young generation of the Kashyaps decides to help Deepak and Sanjana elope, but Radha stops it. Eventually, everyone convinces Kamal and he agrees; Deepak and Sanjana get married. Everyone lives happily ever after.

Cast

Main
 Ragini Khanna as Suhana Bajpai Kashyap: Vidisha and Kamal's daughter; Sanjana's sister; Ishaan's wife (2010–2012)
 Jay Soni as Ishaan Kashyap: Rano and Alok's son; Ishika's brother; Suhana's husband (2010–2012)
Supriya Pilgaonkar as Shailaja Kashyap: Ishwar's wife; Inder and Panna's mother; Meethi's grandmother (2010–2012)

Recurring
Mahesh Thakur as Kamal Kishore Bajpai: Vidisha's widower; Suhana and Sanjana's father (2010–2012)
 Vaishnavi Mahant as Vidisha Bajpai: Kamal's wife; Suhana and Sanjana's mother (2010)
 Sooraj Thapar as Alok Kashyap: Gayatri and Ambarnath's son, Ishwar, Urmi and Radha's brother; Rano's husband; Ishaan and Ishika's father (2010–2012)
 Shruti Ulfat as Rano Kashyap: Alok's wife; Ishaan and Ishika's mother (2010–2012)
 Sadiya Siddiqui as Radha Sharma: Gayatri and Ambarnath's daughter; Ishwar, Alok and Urmi's sister; Sudhir's ex-wife; Deepak's mother (2010–2012)
 Sudhir Pandey as Ambarnath Kashyap: Gayatri's husband; Ishwar, Alok, Urmi and Radha's father; Inder, Panna, Ishaan, Ishika, Deepak and Ilesh's grandfather (2010–2012)
 Anita Kanwal as Gayatri Kashyap: Ambarnath's wife; Ishwar, Alok, Urmi and Radha's mother; Inder, Panna, Ishaan, Ishika, Deepak and Ilesh's grandmother (2010–2012)
 Sulabha Arya as Shanti Bajpai: Kamal's aunt; Suhana and Sanjana's grandaunt (2010–2012)
 Indraneel Bhattacharya as Ishwar Kashyap: Ambarnath and Gayatri's son; Alok, Urmi and Radha's brother; Shailaja's husband; Inder and Panna's father; Meethi's grandfather (2010–2011)
 Jiten Lalwani as Indrabhan "Inder" Kashyap: Shailaja and Ishwar's son; Panna's brother; Rajni's husband; Meethi's father (2010–2012)
 Bhairavi Raichura as Rajni Kashyap: Inder's wife; Meethi's mother (2010–2012)
 Muskaan Uppal as Meethi Kashyap: Rajni and Inder's daughter (2010–2012)
 Moonmoon Banerjee as Panna Kashyap Sharma: Shailaja and Ishwar's daughter; Inder's sister; Raunak's wife (2010–2011)
 Sailesh Gulabani as 
Raunak Sharma: Kamini and Vishwanath's son; Panna's husband (2010–2011)
Anil Parihar: Raunak's lookalike; Piya's husband (2011)
 Sham Mashalkar as Ilesh Bhardwaj: Urmi's son; Disha's husband (2010–2012)
 Pooja Kanwal/Ridheema Tiwari as Disha Bhardwaj: Ilesh's wife (2010–2012)
 Akshay Sethi as Deepak Sharma: Radha and Sudhir's son; Sanjana's husband (2010–2012)
 Tapeshwari Sharma as Sanjana Bajpai Sharma: Vidisha and Kamal's daughter; Suhana's sister; Deepak's wife (2010–2012)
 Neha Narang as Ishika Kashyap: Rano and Alok's daughter; Ishaan's sister (2010–2012)
 Beena Bhatt as Meena: Househelp at Kashyap house (2010–2012)
 Pradeep Kabra as Sudhir: Radha's former husband; Deepak's father (2010, 2012)
 Saurabh Dubey as Vishwanath Sharma: Kamini's husband; Raunak's father (2010–2011)
 Kanika Dang as Kamini Sharma: Vishwanath's wife; Raunak's mother (2010–2011)
 Jayati Bhatia as Manjula "Manju" Saigal: Loud neighbour of Kashyaps (2010–2011)
 Mohit Malhotra as Siddhant "Sid" Bhatnagar: Suhana's ex-boyfriend (2010)
 Nishant Singh Malkani as Raj: Sanjana's friend (2010)
 Shagufta Ali as Sumitra Bua (2010)
 Karan Thakur (actor) as Mohit (2011)
 Sujata Vaishnav as Sharda Bua : Ambarnath's sister (2011)
 Shruti Bapna as Piya Parihar: Anil's wife (2011)
 Hunar Hali as Sonali Abhishek Jhavre: Ishaan's friend; Abhishek's wife (2010–2012)
 Mehak Manwani (cameo) (2011)
 Sarika Nanda as Rachit: Khushi's relative (2011)
 Rajiv Kumar as Mohit: Rano's friend (2011)
 Amit Dolawat as Abhishek Jhavre: Sonali's husband (2012)
 Suchita Trivedi as Savita (2012)
 Armaan Tahil as Shekhar (2012)
 Manasi Parekh as Gulaal (2011)
 Sanaya Irani as Khushi Kumari Gupta Singh Raizada (2012)
 Pooja Gor as Pratigya Saxena Singh (2011)

Sequel
A sequel of the series titled Sasural Genda Phool 2 aired from 7 December 2021 to 15 April 2022 on Star Bharat starring Jay Soni and Shagun Sharma as the new leads.

Reception

Critics
The Hindu stated, "Sasural Genda Phool on Star Plus has proved to be a breath of fresh air from the stereotyped image of ‘saas-bahu (mother in law-daughter in law) serials. The performances of seasoned actors like Sudhir Pandey, Anita Kanwal, Supriya Pilgaonkar, Sooraj Thapar and Sadia Siddiqui provide the flavour of a real Indian joint family where, as Gaurav insists, there is a mix of all light-hearted emotions that will redefine the way viewers perceive our society through television."

The Indian Express quoted the series as 'slice-of-life, light-hearted'. It also stated: "It not only defied the formula of fiction but also proved that viewers are open to watching good stories where serious issues are tackled in a positive way with the right mix of emotions, drama, fun and humour."

Ratings
Initially, it was the slot leader ranging between 2.5 and 3 TVR. Soon, it also featured in top 10 Hindi GEC with its peak of 5+ TVR. However, after May 2011, the ratings of the series started to decrease.

On first week of January 2011, it was the second most watched Hindi GEC after Saath Nibhaana Saathiya, garnering 5.8 TVR. In the third week of January 2011, it occupied third position with 5.49 TVR.

Awards

References

External links
 Official Website on hotstar

StarPlus original programming
Indian television series
Indian television soap operas
2010 Indian television series debuts
Indian comedy television series
2012 Indian television series endings
Television shows set in Delhi